HMS Nimble was a new cutter that the Royal Navy purchased in 1813. The Navy sold her in 1816.

Career
Lieutenant Peter Williams commissioned Nimble on 5 April 1813. (He had come from the gunbrig )

During the capture of San Sebastian Nimble and  blockaded the mouth of Bindassoa from 31 August to 8 September.

Lieutenant Josiah Thompson replaced Williams in August 1814; Williams had been appointed to the rank of Commander on 24 August.

In April–May 1815 Nimble was at the Garonne. There she boarded Young William, which was on her way Bordeaux, and warned her not to enter the river.

On 2 July 1814 the chasse-maree Aimable arrived at Falmouth. Nimble had detained and several other vessels as well.

On 2 November 1815 Nimble returned to Plymouth from Newfoundland. Thompson paid off Nimble in November 1815.

Fate
The "Principal Officers and Commissioners of His Majesty's Navy" offered the "Nimble cutter, of 147 tons", lying at Sheerness, for sale on 18 April 1816.
Nimble was sold to Mr. Nixon on that day.

Postscript
In January 1819, the London Gazette reported that Parliament had voted a grant to all those who had served under the command of Lord Viscount Keith in 1812, between 1813 and 1814, and in the Gironde. Nimble was listed among the vessels that had served under Keith in 1813 and 1814. She had also served under Keith in the Gironde.

Notes

Citations

References
 

1813 ships
Cutters of the Royal Navy